Admirals from Croatia served in many naval forces on the eastern Adriatic seaboard. First admirals (Jakov de Cessamis Šubić and his son Matej, Rafael de Sorba etc.),  were mentioned in 1350s as commanders of the royal fleet of Croatian-Hungarian king Louis I. Officers from today's Croatia served in various navies in control of Croatia or its parts. For instance, Jusuf Mašković served as a grand admiral of Ottoman Navy in 1630s; Ivan of Vrana was a Venetian admiral in late 16th century, taking part in the Battle of Lepanto. Croatian personnel served in the Venetian Navy until its demise in 1797 and, in modern times, in Habsburg/Austro-Hungarian Navy as Croatia was a constituent part of the monarchy (until 1918). First Croatian admirals distinguished themselves commanding Habsburg ships in First Italian War of Independence in 1848.

Croatian admirals helped lead Austro-Hungarian Navy through World War I and later oversaw the creation and development of Royal Yugoslav Navy in the interwar years (1918-1941). In World War II they found themselves on opposing sides, as some chose to collaborate and joined rather limited Navy of Independent State of Croatia (1941–45), while others founded guerilla Partisan Navy, which liberated the Croatian Adriatic and later developed into Yugoslav Navy (1942–91). Croatian admirals co-led Yugoslav Navy during the Cold War, overseeing its development of submarines and frigates, strengthening its capacities. After 1991, breaking off from Yugoslav Navy, Croatian admirals steered Croatian Navy through the Croatian War of Independence from Yugoslavia (1991-5) and worked on joining NATO (2004).

What follows is a list of naval officers from the territory of today's Republic of Croatia. For a list of admirals of the modern, post-1991 Croatian Navy, see List of Croatian Navy admirals. Historical Croat community in Boka Kotorska in Montenegro has produced a long line of admirals (Russian Grand admiral Matija Zmajević, Austrian vice-admiral Aleksandar Bujaković (1792-1870) etc.), but these are excluded from this list.

Fleet Admiral

In Yugoslav Navy, Branko Mamula was promoted to the rank of the Fleet Admiral in 1983. In Croatian Navy, rank of Fleet Admiral was introduced in 1995 as the naval equivalent to the five-star rank of the  OF-10. Commending him on his role as the commander of Croatian Navy during the War of Independence (1991-5), president Tuđman conferred the rank on admiral Letica. Sveto Letica-Barba was the first and so far the only Croatian flag officer to hold this rank.

Admirals

Vice Admirals

Rear Admirals

Sources

Yugoslav Navy
SotL Captain Pecotić, Kuzma (1947-2012). List of Yugoslav Navy admirals
 Petar Strčić. On Admiral Petar Simic
List of admirals with active duty period and year a rank was attained

Royal Yugoslav Navy
 
List of Royal Yugoslav admirals and generals (in Serbian)
List of Royal Yugoslav naval officers who served in collaborationist Croatian Navy

Austro-Hungarian Navy
Schmidt-Brentano, Antonio. Die k. k. bzw. k. u. k. Generalität 1816-1918. Oesterreichischer Staatsarchiv, 2007
Dubrović, Ervin. Vojno-pomorska akademija u Rijeci 1866.-1914. Rijeka: Pomorski fakultet u Rijeci/Muzej Grada Rijeke, 2011.

References

Croatian admirals
Lists of Croatian military personnel
Croatia
Maritime history of Croatia